Dear Eloise / King Midas in Reverse is the seventh U.S. studio album by the British pop band the Hollies, released in November 1967. "King Midas in Reverse" and "Leave Me" (saved from the UK Evolution track line-up) were slotted onto the album while deleting "Pegasus", "Try It" and "Elevated Observations" from the UK Butterfly track listing. It was the Hollies' last album to feature Graham Nash until 1983's What Goes Around, as well as the last to feature songs written solely by members Allan Clarke, Graham Nash and Tony Hicks.

As noted below, this album was really a Nash-led project, and he featured as the lead vocalist more than on any prior album.

Track listing

Personnel
The Hollies
Allan Clarke – vocals, harmonica
Tony Hicks – lead guitar, vocals
Graham Nash – rhythm guitar, vocals
Bobby Elliott – drums
Bernie Calvert – bass, keyboards

References 

1967 albums
The Hollies albums
Parlophone albums
Albums produced by Ron Richards (producer)